The 1982 Kilkenny Senior Hurling Championship was the 88th staging of the Kilkenny Senior Hurling Championship since its establishment by the Kilkenny County Board.

James Stephens were the defending champions.

Ballyhale Shamrocks won the championship after a 3-10 to 2-04 defeat of James Stephens in the final. It was their fourth championship title overall and their first title in two championship seasons.

References

Kilkenny Senior Hurling Championship
Kilkenny Senior Hurling Championship